Fingask Loch is a small lowland freshwater loch that is about three-quarters of a mile from Rae Loch in the valley of the Lunan Burn and is 1.5 miles south-east of Blairgowrie, in Perth and Kinross. Directly to the east is the smaller White Loch, and next to it is the Black Loch.

The loch is also a designated Site of Special Scientific Interest (SSSI), as well as forming part of a Special Area of Conservation.

References

Freshwater lochs of Scotland
Lochs of Perth and Kinross
Tay catchment
Protected areas of Perth and Kinross
Sites of Special Scientific Interest in Scotland
Conservation in the United Kingdom
Special Areas of Conservation in Scotland
Birdwatching sites in Scotland